The Most Important Jazz Album of 1964/65 is an album by trumpeter/vocalist Chet Baker which was recorded in 1964 and released on the Colpix label.

Reception 

The Allmusic review by Matt Collar states: "the icon of '50s cool attempted to reinvigorate his career and showcase his musical growth by enlisting the sensitive piano chops of Hal Galper and old collaborator tenor saxophonist Phil Urso. The new sideman, combined with a heavy dose of Tadd Dameron's compositions, gave Baker a more muscular edge that rubbed nicely with his trademark lyricism updating his sound for the hard bop '60s".

Track listing 
All compositions by Tadd Dameron except where noted
 "Soultrane" – 4:42
 "Walkin'" (Richard Carpenter) – 2:58
 "Tadd's Delight" – 3:55
 "Whatever Possessed Me" (Tadd Dameron, Bernie Hanighen) – 4:03
 "Retsim B" (Hal Galper) – 5:49
 "Gnid" – 5:01
 "Ann, Wonderful One" (Richard Carpenter, Earl Hines) – 4:46
 "Mating Call" – 3:57
 "Margerine" (Galper) – 4:35
 "Flight to Jordan" (Duke Jordan) – 3:36

Personnel 
Chet Baker – flugelhorn, vocals
Phil Urso – tenor saxophone, clarinet
Hal Galper –  piano
Jymie Merritt – bass
Charlie Rice – drums

References 

Chet Baker albums
1964 albums
Colpix Records albums